Sir Edmund Thomas Bewley (born 1837,  died 1908), Irish lawyer and genealogist, born in Dublin on 11 January 1837, was son of Edward Bewley (1806–1876), licentiate of the Royal Colleges of Surgeons and Physicians, Ireland, by his wife Mary, daughter of Thomas Mulock of Kilnagarna, King's County (1791-1857).

Life
Entering Trinity College, Dublin, in 1855, he obtained a classical scholarship in 1857, and a first senior moderatorship and gold medal in experimental science in 1859. In 1860 he graduated with a BA and in 1863 M.A. Subsequently (1885) he gained his LL.D. In 1861 he obtained the degree of BA, ad eundem, and also that of MA, with honours and first gold medal in experimental science, in the Queen's (afterwards Royal) Queen's University of Ireland. Called to the Irish Bar in 1862, he practised successfully for some years, and in 1882 took silk. From 1884 to 1890 he was Regius Professor of Feudal and English Law in Dublin University, and in 1890 became a judge of the supreme court of judicature of Ireland, and judicial commissioner of the Irish Land Commission. Owing to declining health he retired in 1898, when he was knighted by the Lord Lieutenant of Ireland. He was elected F.S.A. on 10 January 1908, and died at Dublin on 27 June 1908.

Bewley married in 1866 Anna Sophie Stewart Colles, daughter of Henry Colles, a member of the Irish bar, and his wife Elizabeth Mayne, and granddaughter of the eminent surgeon Abraham Colles, and by her had two sons and one daughter. Edward Gibson, 1st Baron Ashbourne, Lord Chancellor of Ireland, was his brother-in-law.

Genealogical work
Bewley spent his leisure in genealogical pursuits. He was a frequent contributor to the 'Genealogist', 'Ancestor', and other genealogical periodicals. His most important researches were privately printed. His three books, 'The Bewleys of Cumberland' (1902); 'The Family of Mulock' (1905); and 'The Family of Poe' (1906), are sound and patient investigations into family history; in the monograph on the Poe family, he proved that Edgar Allan Poe was descended from a family of Powell, for generations tenant-farmers in County Cavan.

Other works
Bewley was also the author of:
 'The Law and Practice of Taxation of Costs' (1867)
 'A Treatise on the Common Law Procedure Acts' (1871)
and joint-author of 'A Treatise on the Chancery (Ireland) Act, 1867' (1868).

Arms

References

DNB references
These references are found in the DNB article referred to above.

External links

1837 births
1908 deaths
Irish knights
Judges of the High Court of Justice in Ireland